Leo Díaz may refer to:

 Leo Díaz Urbina (born 1962), Puerto Rican lawyer and politician
 Leo Díaz (musician) (born 1965), Venezuelan merengue and salsa musician
 Leo Díaz (footballer) (born 2000), Argentine footballer

See also
 Leonardo Díaz (disambiguation)